Webster Chapel United Methodist Church is a historic United Methodist church at 405 S. Wheeler in Victoria, Texas.

It was built in 1889 in a Gothic style and was added to the National Register in 1986.

See also

National Register of Historic Places listings in Victoria County, Texas

References

United Methodist churches in Texas
Churches on the National Register of Historic Places in Texas
Churches in Victoria County, Texas
National Register of Historic Places in Victoria, Texas